Valentina is an Italian comic strip series, created in 1965 by the Italian artist Guido Crepax and concluded in 1996.

Originally a minor character working for the comic hero Neutron,  Valentina became the sole protagonist of the series in 1967. The first episode was entitled "La Curva di Lesmo" (referring to a curve of the Italian Formula 1 Grand Prix of Monza). This story was followed by 30 others, collected in a total of seven books, along with two others Lanterna magica (Magic Lantern, 1977) and Valentina pirata (Pirate Valentina), the first in full colour.

Character
Valentina Rosselli, whose appearance is inspired by silent film actress Louise Brooks, is a Milanese photojournalist.  Her boyfriend, Philip Rembrandt, the super-hero Neutron, has the ability to paralyze people, animals, or machines he has seen in the flesh or pictures. Later a child was born to Philip and Valentina, Mattia.

The character Valentina was born on December 25, 1942, in Milan and grew older during the series, the last episode of which was published in 1995. 

As time passed, in Valentina's stories Crepax abandoned the fantasy-science fiction or detective themes of the beginning, introducing a complex, weird mix of erotism, hallucinations, and dreams. The strips also dealt with bisexuality, autoerotic ecstasy, super-sensual abandon, and sadomasochism.

Valentina in other media
In 1973 a feature film called Baba Yaga was based on the comic book. Valentina was played by French actress Isabelle De Funès. The film was directed by Corrado Farina, who had previously made a documentary on the comics by Guido Crepax.

An Italian TV series based on the comicbook was released in 1989. Valentina was played by American actress Demetra Hampton and Philip Rembrandt by Russel Case. Thirteen episodes were filmed, with language tracks in both Italian and English, each 30 minutes long. Selected episodes were edited together into a feature film and shown on late-night American Cable TV.

Stories

 The Lesmo Curve (1965)
 The Subterraneans (1965)
 The Descent (1966)
 Un Poco Loco (1966)
 Ciao, Valentina (1966)
 The Force of Gravity (1967)
 Funny Valentine (1967)
 Valentina in Sovietland (1968)
 Valentina in Boots (1968)
 Marianna in the Country (1968)
 Fearless Paper Doll Valentina (1968)
 Filippo and Valentina (1969)
 Valentina's Baby (1969)
 The Manuscript Found in a Stroller (1970)
 Baba Yaga (1971)
 Bluebeard (1971)
 Who's Afraid of Baba Yaga? (1971)
 Valentina the Fearless (1971)
 Annette (1972)
 The Little King (1972)
 Pietro Giacomo Rogeri (1972)
 The Time Eater (1973)
 Fallen Angels (1973)
 The Empress's New Clothes (1973)
 Reflection (1974)
 Private Life (1975)
 Subconscious Valentina (1976)
 Valentina the Pirate (1976)
 Rembrandt and the Witches (1977)
 Anthropology (1977)
 Le Zattere, Venice (1980)

References

External links
 Valentina from A tutto Comics! 

Adult comic strips
Italian comic strips
1965 comics debuts
Comics characters introduced in 1965
1996 comics endings
Fictional Italian people
Erotic comics
Fantasy comics
Science fiction comics
Fictional photographers
Italian comics characters
Comics spin-offs
Comics about women
Italian comics adapted into films
Comics adapted into television series
Female characters in comics